Gregory Weeks (born 1970) is a lecturer at the International Relations Department at Webster University in Vienna, Austria. He was the Head of the International Relations Department from 2005 until 2011. Weeks teaches and researches civil-military relations, genocide prevention, and twentieth century Austrian and German diplomatic and military history.

Education and research 

He received his doctorate in Contemporary History from the Karl-Franzens-Universität in Graz, Austria, and earned his M.A. in European History from Purdue University. As a Charles H. Revson Foundation Fellow at the United States Holocaust Memorial Museum in 2004–2005, he conducted research on “The Role of the Vienna Municipal Police in the Forced Emigration and Murder of Jews, 1938–1944. In 2006, he was the Baron Friedrich Carl von Oppenheim Chair for the Study of Racism, Antisemitism, and the Holocaust at the Holocaust Martyrs’ and Heroes’ Remembrance Authority, Yad Vashem, in Jerusalem, where he researched anti-Semitic and racist attitudes within the police force in Vienna from 1918 to 1945. Most recently in the Fall of 2008, he was a Corrie ten Boom Fellow at the USC Shoah Foundation’s Visual History Archive in Los Angeles.

Publications and literature 

Weeks has co-authored Vienna’s Conscience: Close-Ups and Conversations after Hitler (2007), which focuses on the fiftieth anniversary of the annexation of Austria by Germany in 1938 and Austrian efforts to confront the country’s World War II past. In addition, he has authored over two dozen scholarly articles, among others on the German colonial wars, Leni Riefenstahl, and the Weimar Republic. Together with the War Crimes Section of the Canadian Department of Justice, he conducted archival research to aid in the post-war trials of Austrian National Socialists. Weeks has received distinguished fellowships and awards from several institutions and foundations including the United States Military Academy, the Leucorea Foundation, and the Stuttgart Seminar in Cultural Studies. With a Holocaust Educational Foundation Fellowship, Professor Weeks spent a summer studying the Holocaust and Jewish Civilization with prominent scholars from across the globe in 1998.

Books and book chapters

Journal articles

Museum exhibit projects 
 Consultant and Organizing Committee Member for “The New Austria” Exhibit commemorating the fiftieth anniversary of the signing of the Austrian State Treaty, Belvedere Museum, Vienna, Austria, 2005
 Consultant to “Austria is Free” Exhibit in the Schallaburg, Lower Austria, 2005
 Consultant to “Austria: 90 Years of the Republic,” 2008–2009 in the Austrian Parliament

References

External links 
 
 Vienna's Conscience Exhibition

1970 births
Living people
Austrian political scientists
21st-century Austrian historians
Historians of Nazism
International relations scholars
University of Graz alumni
Purdue University alumni
Webster University faculty